Jean Bernard Duseigneur (1808 - 6 March 1866), also known as Jehan Duseigneur, was a French romantic sculptor.

References 
 Joseph Thomas, Universal Pronouncing Dictionary of Biography and Mythology, Lippincott, 1908, page 882.
 Universalis encyclopedia entry 

1808 births
1866 deaths
Artists from Paris
19th-century French sculptors
French male sculptors
19th-century French male artists